NIH is the National Institutes of Health in the United States.

NIH may also refer to:

Organisations
 National Institute of Health (Pakistan)
 National Institute of Homoeopathy, India
 Norwegian School of Sport Sciences, a university in Oslo
 National Institute of Hydrology, an Indian government body

Other uses
 Not invented here, whereby something from another organization or culture is deemed inferior to something from one's own organization or culture
 Nih (town), an ancient town in Sistan (modern Iran and Afghanistan)
 NIH shift, a rearrangement of hydrogen in a molecule